Black Toney (1911–1938) was an American Thoroughbred racehorse and sire, owned and raced by Edward R. Bradley

Background
Black Toney was bred by James R. Keene's Castleton Lyons Farm. Keene, whose health was failing (he died in 1913), sold all his holdings in 1912 to Colonel Edward R. Bradley's Idle Hour Stock Farm in Lexington, Kentucky. Some confusion occurred over this sale, and Bradley resold most of the lot, but one of those he kept was a very dark brown yearling he named Black Toney. The price tag for the son of future Hall of Famer Peter Pan, whose own sire was another future Hall of Famer, Commando, by the great Domino, was $1,600. Black Toney's dam was Belgravia, the best daughter of future Hall of Famer Ben Brush. This meant that the almost black yearling with no white markings and a fine head and body was a member of the last crop bred by Keene from his famous Domino/Ben Brush cross.

Racing career
Black Toney was a good racehorse but far from a great one. He raced for four years, coming in the money in 31 of his 40 starts.

Stud record
Black Toney became a very successful breeding stallion, siring many of the horses for which the Idle Hour Stock Farm became famous. The names of Bradley’s horses all began with a "B," a quirk of Bradley's (perhaps because his own name began with a B, or perhaps because of Black Toney.)

Bradley bred him sparingly and yet, even from 21 small crops and a total of 221 foals, the quality of his get was very high. Overall, he sired 40 stakes winners, which amounts to 18 percent of his foals. Black Toney was 10 times among the top 20 American sires by earnings. He was second on the general sire list in 1933 and fifth in 1939.

Black Toney spent his whole stud career at Idle Hour, producing many fine broodmares as well as winners. He died there on September 19, 1938, at the age of 27 of an apparent heart attack.  Colonel Bradley commissioned a bronze statue that he placed over his greatest stallion's grave. It is still there today, on a part of the Darby Dan Farm.

The best of his offspring included:

 Miss Jemima - American Champion Two-Year-Old Filly, 1919
 Black Servant - Second in the 1921 Kentucky Derby, sire of Blue Larkspur, Big Pebble, Baba Kenny Champion Two-Year-Old Filly of 1930, Barn Swallow won 1933 Kentucky Oaks
 Black Gold - U. S. Racing Hall of Fame
 Bimelech - American Champion Colt at two and three, U.S. Racing Hall of Fame inductee
 Brokers Tip - 1933 Kentucky Derby winner
 Balladier- American Champion Two-Year-Colt of 1934, sire of Spy Song
 Black Maria - 1926 American Champion Three-Year-Old Filly, 1927 and 1928 American Champion Older Female Horse
 Black Helen - 1935 American Champion Three-Year-Old Filly, U.S. Racing Hall of Fame
 Big Hurry - the dam of Searching and Bridal Flower Champion Three-Year-Old Filly of 1946
 Bridal Colors - dam of Relic
 Crotala - dam of the leading broodmare Boat

Pedigree

External links
 Black Toney’s pedigree
 Extensive view of pedigree from Influential Sires
 Bradley's statue of Black Toney at Darby Dan

1911 racehorse births
1938 racehorse deaths
Horse monuments
Racehorses bred in Kentucky
Racehorses trained in the United States
United States Champion Thoroughbred Sires
Thoroughbred family 10-c
Chefs-de-Race